Sepa is a genus of skippers that lives in the family Hesperiidae.

References
Natural History Museum Lepidoptera genus database

Hesperiidae
Hesperiidae genera